Chorisochora is a genus of flowering plants belonging to the family Acanthaceae.

Its native range is Socotra, Southern Africa.

Species:

Chorisochora chascanoides 
Chorisochora minor 
Chorisochora striata 
Chorisochora transvaalensis

References

Acanthaceae
Acanthaceae genera